HD 44506 is a solitary, blue hued star located in the southern constellation Columba. The object is also called HR 2288, which is its Bright Star Catalog designation. It has an average apparent magnitude of 5.52, making it faintly visible to the naked eye under ideal conditions.

Emission lines were first noticed in HD 44506's spectrum in 1964. They were again observed by Karl G. Heinze.  It has been suspected to be variable since 1963, but a 1977 search for β Cepheids found inconclusive results; the star is variable in the visual passband but not the ultraviolet passband. As of 2017, the GCVS lists HD 44506 as a suspected variable. In 1982, HD 44506 was officially catalogued as a Be star by Mecerdes Jaschek and Daniel Egret.

This is a hot B-type main-sequence star with a stellar classification of B3 V. It has 12.2 times the mass of the Sun and is estimated to be 13 million years old. This yields a bolometric luminosity 18,951 times that of the Sun from its photosphere.

References

Further reading

B-type main-sequence stars
Be stars
Suspected variables
Columba (constellation)
Columbae, 90
2288
CD-34 02806
044506
030143